Stephanie Hallowich and Chris Hallowich, H/W, v. Range Resources Corporation, Williams Gas/Laurel Mountain Midstream, MarkWest Energy Partners, L.P., MarkWest Energy Group, L.L.C., and Pennsylvania Department of Environmental Protection was a case in the Court of Common Pleas of Washington County, Pennsylvania (Civil Division). The trial was held in August 2011.

Chris Hallowich (Born), and his wife Stephanie Hallowich, operated a farm in Mount Pleasant, Pennsylvania. They sued Range Resources Corporation, Williams Gas/Laurel Mountain Midstream, MarkWest Energy, and the Pennsylvania Department of Environmental Protection for compensation for "health and environmental impacts" from "natural gas development operations".

In the settlement, the plaintiffs received $750,000 from the sale of their home for the purchase of a home elsewhere, but were required to abstain, along with their two minor children, from ever again discussing hydraulic fracturing or Marcellus Shale.  The filed Washington County court documents  in the case show that the Hallowich family was represented by Peter M. Villari, Esq. and Robert N. Wilkey, Esq. of Villari, Brandes, Kline,P.C., a litigation firm located in Conshohocken, Pennsylvania.  The case received significant international notoriety concerning the issue of First Amendment rights as it relates to confidential settlement agreements, gag-orders, and the constitutional rights of minors within the scope of the natural gas drilling industry, operations, and civil litigation. On March 20, 2011, Judge Debbie O'Dell-Senaca, issued an Order and Opinion, reversing a prior trial court's order to seal the settlement documents, and ordering that the Court record, including the settlement documents be unsealed.  Many of the Defendants in the case subsequently appealed, seeking to keep the settlement documents sealed.  Eventually, the settlement documents in the Hallowich case were restored and made publicly available.

References

External links
Stephanie Hallowich and Chris Hallowich, H/W, v. Range Resources Corporation; Williams Gas/Laurel Mountain Midstream; MarkWest Energy Partners, L.P.; MarkWest Energy Group, L.L.C.; and Pennsylvania Department of Environmental Protection 
Children Given Gag Order In Pennsylvania Fracking Suit Settlement | Parenting - Yahoo! Shine
Stephanie Hallowich gas production experiences with Range Resources, MarkWest and Williams
This 7-Year-Old Is Banned From Talking About Fracking—Ever | Mother Jones
Children given lifelong ban on talking about fracking | Environment | The Guardian
Hallowich Unsealed Court Documents, Court of Common Pleas of Washington County, PA, Docket No. 2010-3954
Can You Silence a Child? Inside the Hallowich Case, Caitlin Dickson, The Daily Beast, UK Guardian, September 1, 2013

2011 in the environment
2011 in United States case law
Environment of Pennsylvania
United States environmental case law
Environmental impact in the United States
Environmental issues in the United States
Geology of Pennsylvania
Hydraulic fracturing
Natural gas companies of the United States
2011 in Pennsylvania
Pennsylvania state case law